Hsaung (lit. Winter) is a 1966 Burmese black-and-white drama film, directed by Maung Hla Myo starring Htun Wai, Nyunt Win, San Shar Tin, Hnin Si and San San Win.

Cast
Htun Wai as Kyaw Swar, Maung Maung Latt
Nyunt Win as Htun Kyaw
San Shar Tin as Naw Phaw Lu
Hnin Si as Kyawt Yee
San San Win as Yee Yee
Gyan Sein as Daw Pu

Awards

References

1966 films
1960s Burmese-language films
Films shot in Myanmar
Burmese black-and-white films
1966 drama films
Burmese drama films